Trachylepis hoeschi, also known commonly as Hoesch's mabuya and Hoesch's skink, is a species of lizard in the family Scincidae. The species is native to southwestern Africa.

Etymology
The specific name, hoeschi, is in honor of German zoologist Walter Hoesch (1896–1961), who collected the holotype.

Geographic range
T. hoeschi is found in Angola and Namibia.

Habitat
The preferred natural habitat of T. hoeschi is arid savanna, where it is found on boulders and rock outcrops.

Description
The tail is long, about two times SVL.

Dorsally, T. hoeschi is grayish brown, with transverse bands of dark brown spots. Ventrally, it is white, except for the throat which is yellowish.

Diet
T. hoeschi preys upon insects such as beetles, moths, and wasps.

Reproduction
The mode of reproduction of T. hoeschi is unknown.

References

Further reading
Bauer AM (2003). "On the identity of Lacerta punctata Linnaeus 1758, the type species of the genus Euprepis Fitzinger 1830, and the generic assignment of Afro-Malagasy skinks". African Journal of Herpetology 52: 1–7. (Trachylepis hoeschi, new combination).
Mertens R (1954). "Neue Eidechsen aus Südwest-Afrika". Senckenbergiana 34: 175–183. (Mabuya hoeschi, new species, p. 178). (in German).

Trachylepis
Reptiles described in 1954
Taxa named by Robert Mertens